The 2020–21 Campionato Sammarinese di Calcio was the 36th edition of league competition in San Marino, in which the country's top 15 amateur football teams participate. The season began on 12 September 2020 and ended on 22 May 2021.

The previous season was abandoned due to the COVID-19 pandemic in San Marino. Tre Fiori were declared champions based on league position at the time of abandonment and selected to play in the 2020–21 UEFA Champions League.

The league winner will qualify for the 2021–22 UEFA Champions League preliminary round.

After a delay due to the COVID-19 pandemic, the league restarted on 24 February 2021. Teams will now play each other once instead of twice in order to finish the league on 22 May 2021.

Participating teams
Because there is no promotion or relegation in the league, the same 15 teams who competed in the league the previous season competed in the league again this season.

 Cailungo (Borgo Maggiore)
 Cosmos (Serravalle)
 Domagnano (Domagnano)
 Faetano (Faetano)
 Fiorentino (Fiorentino)
 Folgore (Serravalle)
 Juvenes/Dogana (Serravalle)
 La Fiorita (Montegiardino)
 Libertas (Borgo Maggiore)
 Murata (San Marino)
 Pennarossa (Chiesanuova)
 San Giovanni (Borgo Maggiore)
 Tre Fiori (Fiorentino)
 Tre Penne (Serravalle)
 Virtus (Acquaviva)

First phase
The regular season will be contested in a 15-team group where teams will play each other once. This was changed from the original format of playing each other twice. Eight teams will advance to the second phase. The top four teams at the end of the first phase advance to the second phase and the next eight teams will play for the other four spots in the second phase.

League table

Results

Play–offs
The play–offs were contested on 1–2 May 2021 by the teams which finished from fifth to twelfth in the first phase. When a match ends in a draw, the team with the better regular season position advances.

|}

Second phase

Quarter–finals
The quarter–finals were contested on 5–6 May 2021 by the first four teams from the first phase and the four play–off winners.

|}

Semi–finals
The semi–finals were played 10–11 May 2021.

|}

Third place

Tre Penne qualified for the 2021-22 UEFA Europa Conference League first qualifying round.

Final

Folgore qualified for the 2021–22 UEFA Champions League preliminary round. La Fiorita qualified for the 2021-22 UEFA Europa Conference League first qualifying round by winning the 2020–21 Coppa Titano.

References

External links
 

Campionato Sammarinese di Calcio
San Marino
San Marino
Campionato Sammarinese di Calcio